"In hoc signo vinces" is a Latin phrase conventionally translated into English as "In this sign thou shalt conquer".

The Latin phrase itself renders, rather loosely, the Greek phrase "", transliterated as "en toútōi níka", literally meaning "in this, conquer".

History
Lucius Caecilius Firmianus Lactantius was an early Christian author (c. 240 – c. 320) who became an advisor to the first Christian Roman emperor, Constantine I (and tutor to his son), guiding the Emperor's religious policy as it developed during his reign. His work De Mortibus Persecutorum has an apologetic character, but has been treated as a work of history by Christian writers. Here Lactantius preserves the story of Constantine's vision of the Chi Rho before his conversion to Christianity. The full text is found in only one manuscript, which bears the title, Lucii Caecilii liber ad Donatum Confessorem de Mortibus Persecutorum.

The bishop Eusebius of Caesaria, a historian, states that Constantine was marching with his army (Eusebius does not specify the actual location of the event, but it is clearly not in the camp at Rome), when he looked up to the sun and saw a cross of light above it, and with it the Greek words "(ἐν) τούτῳ νίκα" ("In this, conquer"), a phrase often rendered into Latin as in hoc signo vinces ("in this sign, you will conquer").

At first, Constantine did not know the meaning of the apparition, but on the following night, he had a dream in which Christ explained to him that he should use the sign of the cross against his enemies. Eusebius then continues to describe the Labarum, the military standard used by Constantine in his later wars against Licinius, showing the Chi-Rho sign. The accounts by Lactantius and Eusebius, though not entirely consistent, have been connected to the Battle of the Milvian Bridge (312 AD), having merged into a popular notion of Constantine seeing the Chi-Rho sign on the evening before the battle. 

The phrase appears prominently placed as a motto on a ribbon unfurled with a passion cross to its left, beneath a window over the Scala Regia, adjacent to the equestrian statue of Emperor Constantine, in the Vatican. Emperors and other monarchs, having paid respects to the Pope, descended the Scala Regia, and would observe the light shining down through the window, with the motto, reminiscent of Constantine's vision, and be reminded to follow the Cross.

The Kingdom of Portugal had used this motto since 1139, according with the legend in Lusíadas.

Cultural references

 Inscribed on the banner of the Sanfedismo in 1799
Inscribed in Greek on the flag (obverse side) of the Sacred Band of the Greek War of Independence
 Part of the trademark for Pall Mall cigarettes.  "PALL MALL IN HOC SIGNO VINCES 'WHEREVER PARTICULAR PEOPLE CONGREGATE'"  

It is the public motto of the English Defence League, emblazoned around the group's logo.
The phrase is the motto on some Byzantine coins (e.g. the folles of Constans II).
It is the motto on most regimental flags of the Irish Brigade (France).
In hoc signo vinces is the motto on the O'Donnell coat of arms.
It is the motto for the College of the Holy Cross

See also 
 List of Latin phrases

Notes

Sources
 At the Internet Archive.

External links

Latin religious words and phrases
Latin mottos
Christian terminology
312
Eusebius
Constantine the Great and Christianity